Cameron Ian Cresswell (born 12 September 1999) is an English professional footballer who plays as a forward.

Club career
Cresswell made his debut for Derby County in a 2–0 FA Cup loss to Chorley on 9 January 2021. He was one of fourteen players from Derby County's academy to make their debut in the game, after the entirety of Derby's first team squad and coaching team were forced to isolate due to a COVID-19 outbreak. He made his league debut as a substitute in a 1–0 loss to Stoke City on 20 March 2021. He was released by Derby at the end of the 2020–21 season.

On 9 August 2021, Cresswell joined Norwegian First Division side Start on a deal until the end of the 2022 season. He left the club following the end of his contract.

Career statistics

References

External links

1999 births
Living people
English footballers
Association football forwards
English Football League players
Derby County F.C. players
Norwegian First Division players
IK Start players
English expatriate footballers
Expatriate footballers in Norway
English expatriate sportspeople in Norway